The  Villa Santa Lucía mudflow was a natural disaster in Chaitén commune, southern Chile, that occurred on the morning of December 16, 2017, in the namesake locality, located in the commune of Chaitén, Los Lagos Region. The mudflow caused the death of 21 persons and the disappearance of one.

See also
2004 Futrono mudflows
2015 Northern Chile floods and mudflow

References

Villa Santa Lucia mudflow
Villa Santa Lucia
Landslides in Chile
Villa Santa Lucia
History of Los Lagos Region